The Americans is an American television drama series created by Joe Weisberg, which premiered on January 30, 2013, on the cable network FX. Set during the Cold War period in the 1980s, The Americans is the story of Elizabeth (Keri Russell) and Philip Jennings (Matthew Rhys), two Soviet KGB officers posing as U.S. citizens and a married couple.

The series's sixth and final season, consisting of 10 episodes, premiered on March 28, 2018.

Series overview

Episodes

Season 1 (2013)

Season 2 (2014)

Season 3 (2015)

Season 4 (2016)

Season 5 (2017)

Season 6 (2018)

Ratings

References

External links 
 

 
Lists of American drama television series episodes
Lists of American espionage television series episodes